Socialist Front may refer to:

 Socialist Front (Puerto Rico), a coalition of far-left and pro-independence political organizations
 Socialist Front (Singapore) (Barisan Sosialis), a left-wing political party 1961−1988
 Socialist Front (Singapore, 2010), a current left-wing political party
 Socialist Front (Thailand), a left-wing political coalition 1974−1976

See also
 Malayan Peoples' Socialist Front, a defunct left-wing coalition of Malaysian socialist parties.